Norman Hall may refer to:

 Norman Hall (politician) (1829–1917), member of the U.S. House of Representatives from Pennsylvania
 Norman Hall (Gainesville, Florida), a historic academic building on the eastern campus of the University of Florida
Norman Hall (scientist), Australian fisheries scientist
 Norman B. Hall (1886–1962), first aviation engineering officer in the United States Coast Guard
 Norman J. Hall (1837–1867), officer in the United States Army during the American Civil War
 Norman S. Hall (1895–1964), American screenwriter

See also
 Normans Hall, a Tudor house in Prestbury, Cheshire, England

Hall, Norman